Louis Marquel Roe (born July 14, 1972) is an American former professional basketball player who played in the National Basketball Association (NBA) and the Spanish Liga ACB, among other leagues. He was an All-American college player at the University of Massachusetts Amherst (UMass).

College playing career
Roe played college basketball for the UMass Minutemen, where in 1995, he was the Atlantic 10 Player of the Year, and a consensus second-team All-American.

Professional playing career
Roe was selected by the Detroit Pistons, in the second round (30th pick overall) of the 1995 NBA draft. Roe played in two NBA seasons with the Pistons and Golden State Warriors. In his brief NBA career, he appeared in 66 games, and scored a total of 130 points.

After his NBA career wound up, Roe played professionally in Spain, the Continental Basketball Association (CBA), Italy, South Korea, Mexico and Argentina.

Post playing career
Roe was working with his alma mater's men's team in an administrative role, assisting his former UMass teammate and former head coach, Derek Kellogg.

Education 
Lou Roe is an undergraduate student at the University of Massachusetts Amherst through the University Without Walls program.

Honors 
 Spanish League MVP: (2001)
 2× Spanish League Top Scorer: (2004, 2006)

References

External links 
 Spanish League Profile 
 Italian League Profile 
 UMass College Bio

1972 births
Living people
20th-century African-American sportspeople
21st-century African-American sportspeople
African-American basketball players
All-American college men's basketball players
American expatriate basketball people in Argentina
American expatriate basketball people in Italy
American expatriate basketball people in Mexico
American expatriate basketball people in South Korea
American expatriate basketball people in Spain
American men's basketball players
Atlantic City High School alumni
Baloncesto Málaga players
Basketball players from New Jersey
CB Inca players
CB Lucentum Alicante players
CB Murcia players
Competitors at the 1994 Goodwill Games
Detroit Pistons draft picks
Detroit Pistons players
Gijón Baloncesto players
Gipuzkoa Basket players
Golden State Warriors players
Goodwill Games medalists in basketball
Halcones de Xalapa players
Liga ACB players
Pallacanestro Cantù players
Quad City Thunder players
Real Betis Baloncesto players
Regatas Corrientes basketball players
Rockford Lightning players
Saski Baskonia players
Seoul SK Knights players
Small forwards
Sportspeople from Atlantic City, New Jersey
Tenerife CB players
UMass Minutemen basketball players